The 2014–15 Green Bay Phoenix women's basketball team represented the University of Wisconsin-Green Bay in the 2014–15 NCAA Division I women's basketball season. Their head coach, Kevin Borseth, was in the third season of his second stint at Green Bay and 12th overall at the school. The Phoenix played their home games at the Kress Events Center and were members of the Horizon League. It was the 36th season of Green Bay women's basketball. They finished the season 28–5, 15–1 in Horizon play to win the Horizon League regular and tournament titles to earn an automatic to the 2015 NCAA Division I women's basketball tournament. They lost to then-unbeaten Princeton in the first round.

Roster

Schedule

|-
!colspan=9 style="background:#006633; color:#FFFFFF;"| Exhibition

|-
!colspan=9 style="background:#006633; color:#FFFFFF;"| Regular Season

|-
!colspan=9 style="background:#006633; color:#FFFFFF;"| Horizon League regular season

|-
!colspan=9 style="background:#006633; color:#FFFFFF;"| 2015 Horizon League Tournament

|-
!colspan=9 style="background:#006633; color:#FFFFFF;"| NCAA Women's Tournament

Rankings

See also
2014–15 Green Bay Phoenix men's basketball team

References

Green Bay Phoenix
Green Bay Phoenix women's basketball seasons
Green